The Volkswagen GTI Roadster Vision Gran Turismo is a concept car developed by Volkswagen in 2014.

Development 

The concept car, presented at Worthersee Treffen 2014, originated from another prototype, the Vision GTI, born from a competition created for Volkswagen's young designers and wanted by the Wolfsburg style manager, Klaus Bischoff; this was in response to Sony's invitation to build a Volkswagen that would celebrate the first fifteen years of the driving simulator series Gran Turismo.

Technology 
The vehicle, as evidenced by the name, was in a roadster configuration, equipped with a chassis formed by two shells in carbon fiber separated by a central element. The traction was of the type all-wheel drive 4Motion, while the tires in size 235/35 at the front and 275/30 at the rear 20" sports rims.

Media
The GTI is featured in the Polyphony Digital games Gran Turismo 6, Gran Turismo Sport, and Gran Turismo 7.

See also 
 Vision Gran Turismo

References

References

 Gran Turismo website

Cars introduced in 2014
Gran Turismo (series)
Roadsters
GTI